Eristalinus fuscicornis is a species of hoverfly. It is native to sub-saharan Africa, with specimens being identified from
Angola,
Benin,
DR Congo,
Kenya,
Mozambique,
Nigeria,
South Africa,
Sudan/South Sudan,
Togo,
and Zimbabwe.

References

Diptera of Africa
Eristalinae
Insects described in 1887